The battle of Fougères was a battle on 3 November 1793 at Fougères, during the Virée de Galerne. It was a Vendéen victory.

The Vendéens (on their way from taking Mayenne) decided to march on Saint-Malo to make contact with the British and, recently joined by the Chouans, marched on Fougères on the way. Realising the danger, the Republicans prepared to defend the city and castle, with adjudant général Brière gathering 6,000 National Guards and soldiers from line regiments and inspecting the castle's defences. Many administrators chose to leave the city and flee towards Rennes, with some exceptions staying put, such as mayor Lesueur.

Course

After the battle

Retreat

Fougères reoccupied by the Republicans

Bibliography

Conflicts in 1793
Battles of the War in the Vendée
Military history of Brittany
History of Ille-et-Vilaine